Jeff Neal (born June 15, 1969) is a drummer and vocalist best known for his affiliation with classic rock band Boston from 2002 to present.

Career
Prior to joining Boston and after graduating from the University of Maine at Farmington with a Bachelor of Science in Secondary Education, Neal (who is originally from Maine) performed for over 15 years in a wide variety of bands touring throughout New England, primarily playing small clubs and venues. In late 2002, while Boston leader Tom Scholz was vacationing in Maine, he saw Neal play at Sunday River Ski Resort with his then-current band, Punchbug. After introducing himself between sets, Scholz offered Neal an audition. Soon afterward, Neal was offered the position as the group's touring drummer and background vocalist. He performed with the band on its 2003 Corporate America tour, its 2004 Boston Returns tour and its 2008 tour alongside fellow classic rockers Styx. Other appearances with the band include various one-offs performing Boston's version of "The Star-Spangled Banner"; at Fenway Park prior to the 2003 ALDS Game 3 matchup between the Boston Red Sox and the Oakland Athletics; and at Gillette Stadium in January 2004 prior to the sub-zero wind-chill playoff game between the New England Patriots and the Tennessee Titans. He also appeared with the group in late 2006 at Symphony Hall in Boston, accompanied by members from the Boston Pops Orchestra for Doug Flutie Day.

External links 
 Neal's official website
 Boston's official website
 

1969 births
20th-century American drummers
21st-century American drummers
American male drummers
American rock drummers
Boston (band) members
Living people